ABC Australia may refer to:

 Australian Broadcasting Corporation (ABC), the national broadcast network in Australia
 ABC Australia (Southeast Asian TV channel), an Asia-Pacific pay-TV channel operated by the ABC
ABC Radio (Australia), the radio network operated by the ABC
 ABC Television (Australian TV network), the TV network of the ABC
ABC TV (Australian TV channel), an Australian TV channel, formerly ABC1